Hoyts Pond is a  pond in the southern part of South Pond village in Plymouth, Massachusetts, United States, within the Eel River watershed, southeast of Boot Pond, southwest of Island Pond, and northeast of Myles Standish State Forest. The inflow is Gunners Exchange Pond, which is connected to Hoyts Pond.

External links
Environmental Protection Agency
South Shore Coastal Watersheds - Lake Assessments

Ponds of Plymouth, Massachusetts
Ponds of Massachusetts